The Nakayama Himba Stakes (Japanese 中山牝馬ステークス) is a Grade 3 horse race for Thoroughbred fillies and mares aged four and over, run in March over a distance of 1800 metres on turf at Nakayama Racecourse.

The Nakayama Himba Stakes was first run in 1983 and has held Grade 3 status since 1984. The race was run at Tokyo Racecourse in 1988 and at Hanshin Racecourse in, 2011.

Winners since 2000

Earlier winners

 1984 - Mejiro Heine
 1985 - Shadai Cosmos
 1986 - Yukino Rose
 1987 - Katsu Dynamic
 1988 - Soshin Hoju
 1989 - Rikiai Northern
 1990 - Jim Queen
 1991 - Yukino Sunrise
 1992 - Scarlet Bouquet
 1993 - Rabbit Ball
 1994 - Hokkai Seres
 1995 - Alpha Cute
 1996 - Prairie Queen
 1997 - Syourinomegami
 1998 - Mejiro Lambada
 1999 - Narita Luna Park

See also
 Horse racing in Japan
 List of Japanese flat horse races

References

Turf races in Japan